Sketchpad (a.k.a. Robot Draftsman) is a computer program written by Ivan Sutherland in 1963 in the course of his PhD thesis, for which he received the Turing Award in 1988, and the Kyoto Prize in 2012. It pioneered human–computer interaction (HCI), and is considered the ancestor of modern computer-aided design (CAD) programs as well as a major breakthrough in the development of computer graphics in general. For example, the graphical user interface (GUI) was derived from Sketchpad as well as modern object-oriented programming. Using the program, Ivan Sutherland showed that computer graphics could be used for both artistic and technical purposes in addition to demonstrating a novel method of human–computer interaction.

History 
Sutherland was inspired by the Memex from "As We May Think" by Vannevar Bush. Sketchpad inspired Douglas Engelbart to design and develop oN-Line System at the Augmentation Research Center (ARC) at the Stanford Research Institute (SRI) during the 1960s.

See History of the graphical user interface for a more detailed discussion of GUI development.

Software 

Sketchpad was the earliest program ever to utilize a complete graphical user interface.

The clever way the program organized its geometric data pioneered the use of "master" ("objects") and "occurrences" ("instances") in computing and pointed forward to object oriented programming. The main idea was to have master drawings which one could instantiate into many duplicates. If the user changed the master drawing, all the instances would change as well.

Geometric constraints was another major invention in Sketchpad, letting the user easily constrain geometric properties in the drawing—for instance, the length of a line or the angle between two lines could be fixed.

As a trade magazine said, clearly Sutherland "broke new ground in 3D computer modeling and visual simulation, the basis for computer graphics and CAD/CAM". Very few programs can be called precedents for his achievements. Patrick J. Hanratty is sometimes called the "father of CAD/CAM" and wrote PRONTO, a numerical control language at General Electric in 1957, and wrote CAD software while working for General Motors beginning in 1961. Sutherland wrote in his thesis that Bolt, Beranek and Newman had a "similar program" and T-Square was developed by Peter Samson and one or more fellow MIT students in 1962, both for the PDP-1.

The Computer History Museum holds program listings for Sketchpad.

Hardware
Sketchpad ran on the Lincoln TX-2 (1958) computer at MIT, which had 64k of 36-bit words. The user drew on the screen with the recently invented light pen. Of the 36 bits available to store each display spot in the display file, 20 gave the coordinates of that spot for the display system and the remaining 16 gave the address of the n-component element responsible for adding that spot to display.

The TX-2 was an experimental machine and the hardware changed frequently (on Wednesdays, according to Sutherland).  By 1975, the light pen and the Cathode-ray tube with which it had been used had been removed.

Publications 
The Sketchpad program was part and parcel of Sutherland's Ph.D. thesis at MIT and peripherally related to the Computer-Aided Design project at that time.
Sketchpad: A Man-Machine Graphical Communication System.

See also 
Comparison of CAD software

References

Bibliography
 , explains the principles of "Sketchpad".
 .
 .
 .
 .
 .

External links

 .
 Archived at Ghostarchive and the Wayback Machine: .
 Demo 1, 2

1963 software
Computer graphics
Graphical user interfaces
History of human–computer interaction